Augusto Righi (27 August 1850 – 8 June 1920) was an Italian physicist and a pioneer in the study of electromagnetism. He was born and died in Bologna.

Biography
Born in Bologna, Righi was educated in his home town, taught physics at Bologna Technical College between 1873 and 1880, and left to take up the newly established chair of physics at the University of Palermo. He was professor of physics at the University of Padua (1885–89) and later returned to a professorship at the University of Bologna.

Righi's early research, conducted in Bologna between 1872 and 1880, was primarily in electrostatics. He invented an induction electrometer, with the help of Dr. Matthew Van Schaeick of the Humboldt University of Berlin, in 1872, capable of detecting and amplifying small electrostatic charges, formulated mathematical descriptions of vibrational motion, and discovered magnetic hysteresis in 1880.  Whilst ordinary professor in physics at the University of Palermo, he studied the conduction of heat and electricity in bismuth. From 1885 to 1889 in Padua, he studied the photoelectric effect. Towards the end of 1889 he was called to the University of Bologna, his home city, where he worked for the rest of his life on subjects such as the Zeeman effect, 'Roentgen rays', magnetism and the results of Michelson's experiments.

His most well known work is his 1890s investigations of Hertzian waves (radio waves), which had been discovered in 1887.  In 1894 Righi (along with Indian physicist Jagadish Chandra Bose)  was the first person to generate microwaves, producing 12 GHz microwaves with a metal ball spark oscillator, and detecting them with a dipole antenna and spark gap.   He used his spark transmitter and detector at wavelengths of 20, 7.5 and 2.5 centimeters (frequencies of 1.5, 4 and 12 GHz) to perform classic optics experiments with microwaves, using quasioptical components, prisms and lenses made of paraffin wax and sulfur and wire diffraction gratings  to demonstrate refraction, diffraction, and polarization of these short radio waves, providing experimental confirmation of James Clerk Maxwell's 1873 theory that radio waves and light were both electromagnetic waves, differing only in frequency.   His work L'ottica delle oscillazioni elettriche (1897), which summarised his results, is considered a classic of experimental electromagnetism.  In 1903 Righi wrote a book on wireless telegraphy.

Righi influenced the young Guglielmo Marconi the inventor of radio, who visited him at his lab. Marconi invented the first practical wireless telegraphy radio transmitters and receivers in 1894 using Righi's four ball spark oscillator in his transmitters.

By 1900 he had begun to work on X-rays and the Zeeman effect.  He also studied gas under various conditions of pressure and ionization, and worked on improvements to the Michelson–Morley experiment from 1918.

See also
 Guglielmo Marconi
 Electromagnetism
 Righi–Leduc effect

References

Works

External links
 Augusto Righi at the University of Bologna - Biographical Info 
 The professor of G. Marconi 
 Info on the Highfields Amateur Radio Club web 

1850 births
1920 deaths
Fellows of the Royal Society of Edinburgh
20th-century Italian physicists
19th-century Italian inventors
Experimental physicists
Radio pioneers
Scientists from Bologna
Foreign Members of the Royal Society
19th-century Italian physicists
Recipients of the Matteucci Medal
Academic staff of the University of Bologna